Swing Along is an LP album by The Four Lads, released by Columbia Records as catalog number CS 8106 in 1959.

Track listing

The album was reissued, combined with the 1960 Four Lads album Everything Goes!!!, in compact disc format, by Collectables Records on July 31, 2001.

The Four Lads albums
Columbia Records albums
1959 albums